Leslie Alexander Smith (16 March 1892 – 8 April 1968) was an Australian rules footballer who played with Melbourne in the Victorian Football League (VFL).

Family
The son of John Joseph Smith (1857–1919), and Mary Ann Smith (1861–1945), née Willmott,  Leslie Alexander Smith was born at Hotham (now known as North Melbourne, Victoria) on 16 March 1892.

He married Agnes Elizabeth Chantler (1898–1991) on 4 April 1925.

Football

Melbourne (VFL)
Recruited from Richmond Districts, he played in 7 senior matches for Melbourne in 1914.

Brighton (VFA)
He transferred to Brighton in 1915.

Marksman
On 14 October 1932, representing the Melbourne Cricket Club Rifle Club, Smith, a professional gunsmith with Edwards and Motton (see catalogue), won The King's Prize at the national rifle shooting competition held in Sydney.

Death
He died at Heidelberg, Victoria on 8 April 1968.

Footnotes

References

External links 
 
 
 Les Smith, at Demonwiki.
 "Smith, L _Bri21", at The VFA Project.

1892 births
Australian rules footballers from Melbourne
Melbourne Football Club players
Australian male sport shooters
1968 deaths
Gunsmiths
People from North Melbourne